The Battle of Ravenna was fought between supporters of Orestes and supporters of Julius Nepos for control of the Western Roman Empire. In prelude to the battle, Orestes had been ordered to raise a large army to confront tribal rulers in Gaul. Instead he led his force against emperor Julius Nepos in the capital Ravenna. Nepos was defeated and deposed, but managed to flee to Dalmatia. Orestes in turn enthroned his son Romulus Augustulus as Roman emperor. He was in turn overthrown by Odoacer in September 476 following the Roman defeat at Pavia.

Sources
 

475
Ravenna
Battles involving the Roman Empire
Ravenna
Ravenna